Leon Harris was an American art director. He was nominated for an Academy Award in the category Best Art Direction for the film Star Trek: The Motion Picture.

Selected filmography
 Star Trek: The Motion Picture (1979)

References

External links
 

Year of birth missing
Year of death missing
American art directors